Bashneft-Ufaneftekhim is a large refinery located in Russia, specializing in the refining of several hydrocarbons such as West Siberian oil, a high-sulfur oil blend from the Arlanskoye field, and gas condensate. The refinery produces various grades of fuel and petrochemicals.

The refinery was founded in 1957 by Chernikov, an oil refinery.

Bashneft-Ufaneftekhim provides a range of services including fuel and gas catalysis, goods production, and aromatic hydrocarbon production. The refinery operates several technological units, including delayed coking, hydrocracking, catalytic cracking, deasphalting, visbreaking, and bitumen production, which ensure a high rate of crude oil refining depth.

References

External links

 
 Official website in Russian

Petroleum industry in Russia
Companies based in Ufa
Oil refineries in the Soviet Union